The Coinage Act 1816 (56 Geo. III c.68), also known as Liverpool's Act, defined the value of the pound sterling relative to gold.  One troy pound of standard (22-carat) gold was defined as equivalent to £46 14s 6d., i.e. , the guinea having been fixed in December 1717 at  exactly. According to its preamble, the purposes of the Act were to:
 establish a single gold standard for transactions of all sizes.

See also
 Great Recoinage of 1816

References

External links
 Text as originally enacted
 The Royal Mint - official website
 The Royal Mint - official blog

United Kingdom Acts of Parliament 1816
Repealed United Kingdom Acts of Parliament
History of British coinage
Gold legislation
1816 in economics
Gold standard
Currencies of the United Kingdom
Gold in the United Kingdom
Currency law in the United Kingdom